An uncle is a family relative and, in some cultures, is used as a term of familiarity or respect for a middle-aged or elderly man.

Uncle , UNCLE or The Uncle may also refer to:

Film and TV
 U.N.C.L.E., a fictional organization in the TV series The Man from U.N.C.L.E.
 Uncle (British TV series), a BBC Three sitcom
 Uncle (film), a 2018 Indian Malayalam drama thriller film
 Uncle (South Korean TV series), a 2021 television series
 The Uncle, a 1965 British drama film

Other uses
 "Uncle", a song by Mindless Self Indulgence on the album If (2008)
 Uncle, a term sometimes used to address an Australian Aboriginal elder (of any age)
 Uncle (book series), by J. P. Martin
Uncle (novel), a children's novel by J. P. Martin

See also

 Uncle Jammu, a Finnish child murderer
 Uncle Remus, a folktale of the southern United States
 Uncle Sam, national personification of the U.S. federal government
 Unkle, a British musical outfit
 Say Uncle, an expression of speech in the United States and Canada
 
 Auntie (disambiguation)